A status referendum was held on the island of Sint Eustatius on 14 October 1994, alongside simultaneous referendums on Bonaire, Saba and Sint Maarten. A majority voted for maintaining the status quo.

Result

See also
1994 Bonaire status referendum
1994 Saban status referendum
1994 Sint Maarten status referendum

References

1994
1994
Sint Eustatius
1994 referendums
1994 in the Netherlands Antilles
October 1994 events in North America